Paunnacussing Creek is a tributary of the Delaware River contained wholly within Bucks County, Pennsylvania in the United States. It rises from a pond north of Mechanicsville, in Buckingham Township and drains into the Delaware at Bull Island just upstream of Lumberville in Solebury Township.

History
The original inhabitants of the area of Paunnacussing Creek were the Lenape people. Later, it became a part of the Province of Pennsylvania in 1681.
The first mention of the stream was on Cutler's resurvey in 1703. At one time there were several mills along the creek as evidenced by dams along the waterway, which were damaged or destroyed during the great flood of 3 August 1885, which caused severe damage in the village of Carversville, washed out local roads, and destroyed the aqueduct carrying the Delaware Canal over the creek. The cost of replacing the aqueduct was $10,000.

Statistics
The Geographic Name Information System I.D. is 1183392, U.S. Department of the Interior Geological Survey I.D. is 03093.

Course

At Carversville, it picks up two unnamed tributaries, one from the right bank, then one from the left.

Geology

Paunnacussing Creek lies in the Stockton Formation of bedrock consisting of arkosic sandstone, buff to light-gray, and red to purple-red sandstone, shale, siltstone, and mudstone laid down during the Triassic.

Municipalities
Bucks County
Solebury Township
Buckingham Township

Crossings and Bridges

See also
List of rivers of the United States
List of rivers of Pennsylvania
List of Delaware River tributaries

References

Rivers of Bucks County, Pennsylvania
Rivers of Pennsylvania
Tributaries of the Delaware River
Wild and Scenic Rivers of the United States